Show is a live album released in 1993 by the British alternative rock band The Cure. It was recorded live over two nights at The Palace of Auburn Hills, Auburn Hills, Michigan (a suburb of Detroit) in 1992, during the successful Wish tour. Show was also released as a concert video.

This live album was released along with Paris, which was recorded in Paris. Show leaned somewhat more towards the band's poppier and more recent material such as "Just Like Heaven", "Pictures of You" and "Friday I'm in Love" while Paris skewed towards their older cult-classics.

Track listing
Show is a double-CD release in most cases. There are various versions with differing track listings. The US version is the only one-disc edition. The songs which did not fit onto the US disc ("Tape", "Fascination Street", "The Walk" and "Let's Go to Bed") were released as the EP Sideshow. The video version, released on VHS, CD-i and LaserDisc, contains extra tracks.

Disc one
 "Tape" – 2:25
 "Open" (Wish) – 7:18
 "High" (Wish) – 3:31
 "Pictures of You" (Disintegration) – 7:38
 "Lullaby" (Disintegration) – 4:25
 "Just Like Heaven" (Kiss Me, Kiss Me, Kiss Me) – 3:37
 "Fascination Street" (Disintegration) – 5:00
 "A Night Like This" (The Head on the Door) – 4:46
 "Trust" (Wish) – 5:15

Disc two
 "Doing the Unstuck" (Wish) – 4:20
 "The Walk" (Japanese Whispers) – 3:32
 "Let's Go to Bed" (Japanese Whispers) – 3:41
 "Friday I'm in Love" (Wish) – 3:45
 "In Between Days" (The Head on the Door) – 3:12
 "From the Edge of the Deep Green Sea" (Wish) – 7:54
 "Never Enough" (Mixed Up) – 4:52
 "Cut" (Wish) – 5:25
 "End" (Wish) – 7:58

Single-disc release:
 "Open" (Wish) - 7:20
 "High" (Wish) - 3:31
 "Pictures of You" (Disintegration) - 7:38
 "Lullaby" (Disintegration) - 4:15
 "Just Like Heaven" (Kiss Me, Kiss Me, Kiss Me) - 3:34
 "A Night Like This" (The Head on the Door) - 4:45
 "Trust" (Wish) - 5:14
 "Doing the Unstuck" (Wish) - 4:00
 "Friday I'm in Love" (Wish) - 3:34
 "In Between Days" (The Head on the Door) - 2:55
 "From the Edge of the Deep Green Sea" (Wish) - 7:54
 "Never Enough" (Mixed Up) - 4:45
 "Cut" (Wish) - 5:32
 "End" (Wish) - 8:04

Sideshow EP:
 "Tape (intro) - 3:07
 "Just Like Heaven" (Kiss Me, Kiss Me, Kiss Me) - 3:47
 "Fascination Street" (Disintegration) - 5:01
 "The Walk" (Japanese Whispers) - 3:32
 "Let's Go to Bed" (Japanese Whispers) - 3:38

CD-i release (2-disc music video)

CD-i disc one
 "Tape"
 "Open" (Wish)
 "High" (Wish)
 "Pictures of You" (Disintegration)
 "Lullaby" (Disintegration)
 "Just Like Heaven" (Kiss Me, Kiss Me, Kiss Me)
 "Fascination Street" (Disintegration)
 "A Night Like This" (The Head on the Door)
 "Trust" (Wish)
 "Doing the Unstuck" (Wish)
 "The Walk" (Japanese Whispers)
 "Let's Go to Bed" (Japanese Whispers)
 "Friday I'm in Love" (Wish)

CD-i disc two
 "In Between Days" (The Head on the Door)
 "From the Edge of the Deep Green Sea" (Wish)
 "Never Enough" (Mixed Up)
 "Cut" (Wish)
 "End" (Wish)
 "To Wish Impossible Things" (Wish)
 "Primary" (Faith)
 "Boys Don't Cry" (Boys Don't Cry) 
 "Why Can't I Be You?" (Kiss Me, Kiss Me, Kiss Me)
 "A Forest" (Seventeen Seconds)

Personnel
Robert Smith – vocals, guitar, 6-string bass
Simon Gallup – bass guitar
Porl Thompson – guitar, keyboards
Boris Williams – drums, percussion 
Perry Bamonte – keyboards, guitar, 6-string bass

Certifications

References

The Cure live albums
1993 live albums
Fiction Records live albums
Elektra Records live albums